Omegamatic may refer to:
 The Omegamatic, fictional Shikadi-controlled space station  in Commander Keen games
 Omega Seamaster Omegamatic, watch